Bazmak or Bezmak, also rendered as Bizmak, may refer to:
 Bazmak-e Olya
 Bazmak-e Sofla